Amarillo City Transit, marketed under the moniker of ACT, is the primary provider of mass transportation in Amarillo, Texas. The agency was established in 1966, after a municipal takeover of private bus transportation. Thirteen routes run through the city daily but Sundays and holidays.

Routes
As of August 27, 2018, the new route plan was implemented.
11 SW 6th Avenue - SW 9th Avenue - South Coulter Street - Westgate Mall
12 NW 3rd Avenue - West Amarillo Boulevard
13 hospital district- west gate mall
21 Hamlet 
22 East Amarillo Boulevard - North Grant Street
23 East Amarillo Boulevard - NE 24th Avenue
31 SE 10th Avenue - South Grand Street
32 SE 3rd Avenue - Ross Street - Osage Street - SE 34 Avenue
33 SE 3rd Avenue - South Arthur Street - Wolflin Avenue - DMV - I-40 east
41 Washington Street
42 I-27
43 SW 10th Avenue - South Georgia Street - SW 45th Avenue - Soncy Road - Westgate Mall
44 SW 3rd Avenue - South Georgia Street - Plains Boulevard - South Western Street - SW 34th Avenue - Soncy Road - Westgate Mall

Previous Routes
1 North Hughes
2 North Polk 
3 Amarillo Blvd
4 Sunrise
5 South Washington
6 Wolfin Village
7 Western Plaza
8 Medical Center

References

 ACT

Bus transportation in Texas
Transportation in Amarillo, Texas